Zuojiang Zhuang is a dialect-bund in Zhuang languages spoken along the Zuo River, including the counties of Tiandeng, Daxin, Chongzuo, Ningming, Longzhou, and Pingxiang in Guangxi, some villages in Funing in Yunnan, and Vietnam, and is a putative branch of Tai languages of China and Vietnam. Also known as Tho (a name shared with Tày and Cuoi of Vietnam).

Classification
In the 1950s as part of the classification of Zhuang languages, Zuojiang Zhuang was recognised as a dialect, or language, in Guangxi, China. In 2007, ISO 639-3 also included speakers Vietnam as the Zuojiang river goes into there. The classification of Phittiyaporn (2009) suggests Zuojiang is not a single branch, but part of two main branches of the Tai language family (clades B, F, and H). See Tai languages for details.

References

Pittayaporn, Pittayawat. 2009. The Phonology of Proto-Tai. Ph.D. dissertation. Department of Linguistics, Cornell University.

Tai languages